Seyed Payam Niazmand Ghader (born 6 April 1995) is an Iranian professional footballer who plays as a goalkeeper for iranian club Sepahan.

Niazmand set the new all-time record at 940 consecutive minutes without conceding a goal. Mohammad Nouri ended his goalless streak by beating him in the 50th minute of the same match. He was included in Iran's preliminary squad for the 2019 AFC Asian Cup.

Club career 
Niazmand started his senior career in Iran at Paykan in 2015, where he made 24 appearances in three seasons. In 2018, he joined Sepahan.niazmand was included in Sepahan's lineup in 89 games continuously. On 13 July 2021, Niazmand joined Primeira Liga side Portimonense.

International career
On 8 October 2020, Niazmand made his debut for the Iran national team in a 2–1 friendly win against Uzbekistan.

Career statistics

Club

International

References

External links

 
 
 

Living people
1995 births
Iranian footballers
Association football goalkeepers
Paykan F.C. players
Sepahan S.C. footballers
Portimonense S.C. players
Azadegan League players
Persian Gulf Pro League players

Iran international footballers
2019 AFC Asian Cup players
Iranian expatriate footballers
Iranian expatriate sportspeople in Portugal
Expatriate footballers in Portugal
2022 FIFA World Cup players